Zhuo Lin (April 6, 1916 – July 29, 2009) was the third and last wife of Deng Xiaoping, former Paramount leader of China.

Biography
Born Pu Qiongying in Xuanwei, Yunnan province, she was the daughter of an industrialist who manufactured Yunnan ham. She attended Peking University, then moved to the Chinese Communist Party base in Yan'an, changed her name to Zhuo Lin, and then joined the Chinese Communist Party in 1938. In 1939 she married Deng in front of Mao Zedong's cave dwelling in Yan'an. They had five children - three daughters (Deng Lin, Deng Nan, Deng Rong) and two sons (Deng Pufang, Deng Zhifang). She died on July 29, 2009, aged 93, in Beijing.

References

External links
Obituary 

1916 births
2009 deaths
Deng Xiaoping family
Chinese communists
People from Qujing
National University of Peking alumni